is a Japanese singer and songwriter from Mihara city in Hiroshima Prefecture. She presently belongs to Cutting Edge.

Discography

Singles
 Orange (1999)
 Beat Goes On and The (1999)
 Town to Town (2000)
 One Blood (import) (2000)
 Kaze o Atsumete (風をあつめて) (2001).
 Travellin 'man (2001)
 Free wave/Joy to the World (2002)
 Hikarinouta (ひかりのうた) (2003).
 500-mile/Love (2003)
 Try to Fly (2004)
 New world (新世界) (2005)
 Thank You (2006)
 Rainy Blue with Latyr Sy (2006)

Albums
 One Blood (2000)
 Niji (2002)
 Sun Road (2003)
 Leyona's Greatest Groovin' (2004)
 Nu World (2005)
 SPICE! (2005)
 Clappin'  (2006)
 Rollin' and Tumblin'  (2007)
 Off The Lip (2007)
 Patchwork (2010)

References 

 iTunes Store Special Interview
 Rising Sun Rock Festival in EZO

External links 
 Sony Music Artist Profile
 
 Speedstar Records Profile
 OnGen Music Lounge Profile

1977 births
English-language singers from Japan
Living people
Musicians from Hiroshima Prefecture
Writers from Hiroshima
20th-century Japanese women singers
20th-century Japanese singers
21st-century Japanese women singers
21st-century Japanese singers